A customer data platform (CDP) is a collection of software which creates a persistent, unified customer database that is accessible to other systems. Data is pulled from multiple sources, cleaned and combined to create a single customer profile. This structured data is then made available to other marketing systems. According to Gartner, customer data platforms have evolved from a variety of mature markets, "including multichannel campaign management, tag management and data integration."

Capabilities
Commonalities across CDPs:
 marketer-managed;
 unified, persistent, single database for customer behavioral, profile and other data, from any internal or external source;
 consistent identifier that links all of a customer's data;
 accessible by external systems and structured to support marketers' needs for campaign management, marketing analyses and business intelligence;
 provide a 360-degree view of the customer;
 group customers into audience segments; and
 allow users the capability to predict the optimum next move with a customer.

In addition, some CDPs provide additional functions such as marketing performance measurement analytics, predictive modeling, and content marketing.

Data collection
A main advantage of a CDP is its ability to collect data from a variety of sources (both online and offline, with a variety of formats and structures) and convert that disparate data into a standardized form. Some of the data types a standard CDP should work with include:
 Customer events: Browsing activity, actions on a website or in an app, clicks on a banner, etc.
 Transactional data: Data including purchases, returns, data from a POS terminal.
 Customer attributes: Age, gender, birthday, date of first purchase, segmentation data, customer predictions
 Campaign evaluation data: Impressions, clicks, reach, engagement, etc.
 Customer-company history: data from interactions with customer service, NPS scores, data from chatbots, social media posts, survey verbatims, focus group transcripts, call centre audio files etc.

Marketing automation systems
A CDP is fundamentally different in design and function when compared with marketing automation systems, though CDPs provide some of the functionality of marketing systems and customer engagement platforms. CDP tools are designed to talk to other systems. They retain details from other systems that the engagement or automation tool does not. This is valuable for trend analysis, predictive analytics, and recommendations that can leverage historical data.

CDP vs DMP
A data management platform (DMP) collects anonymous web and digital data. CDPs collect data that is tied to an identifiable individual. Users of CDP can leverage the intelligence to provide more personalized content and delivery. A DMP enables marketers to serve targeted ads programmatically and at scale using anonymized customer data in the form of third-party browser cookies. 

A data warehouse or data lake collects data, usually from the same source and with the same structure of information.  While this information can be manually synthesized, neither type of system delivers the identity resolution needed to build a consolidated single customer view. Data warehouses are often updated at scheduled intervals, whereas CDPs ingest and make available data in real-time. In practice, most CDPs use the same technologies as data lakes; the difference is the CDP has built-in features to do additional processing to make the data usable, while a data lake may not.

Main differences between a customer data platforms (CDP) vs. data management platforms (DMP):

History of the CDP industry
Although similar tools existed in the past, the term Customer Data Platform was first used in 2010. It was meant to describe a marketing software that could build a single customer view (a collection of all of a customer's data and events into one file).

These databases were originally used to power some other type of software, such as a marketing automation suite, a personalization engine, or a campaign management tool.

At this time, most customer databases were specially designed to support a vendor’s individual software application. Because of this, customer databases could not easily interconnect or interoperate with other layers of the technology stack. Data could not easily be moved from one place to another, so it could be leveraged to improve business performance.

Because of these limitations, many vendors made the decision to begin adding more advanced integration tools (APIs) to their customer databases and converting them into what we now know as Customer Data Platforms (CDPs).

The power of the database behind these systems eventually became desirable in its own right. They evolved to become full-fledged software. Simultaneously, some tag management and web analytics providers also transformed their platforms into similar solutions, creating CDPs with a different origin but the same use.

These platforms became successful, and by 2016 they had become the CDP industry. This industry experienced quick growth, due to marketers recognizing the shortcomings of alternatives like DMPs and data lakes, as well as the capabilities a CDP could offer them. The CDP Institute estimates industry revenue at $1.9 billion for 2022, up 19 percent from $1.6 billion in 2021.

References

Customer relationship management
Marketing analytics
Marketing software
Marketing techniques
Services marketing